Cheryl Amanda McGehee (née Peake; 30 March 1966 – 12 June 2013) was a British pair skater. With her skating partner, Andrew Naylor, she was a six-time British national champion. The pair finished 12th at the 1988 Winter Olympics. Other notable results for the pair included fifth-place finishes at the European Figure Skating Championships in 1987 and 1989, and a ninth place at the 1987 World Championships.

After retiring from amateur competition in 1992, Peake skated with Dorothy Hamill's "Cinderella... Frozen in Time" tour, from 1992 to 1995; she also appeared in the 1994 TV special. She later worked as a skating coach in the United States and had two sons.

Peake died on 12 June 2013 in Hollywood, Florida.

Peake and Naylor results

References

English emigrants to the United States
British female pair skaters
English female pair skaters
1966 births
2013 deaths
Olympic figure skaters of Great Britain
Figure skaters at the 1988 Winter Olympics
Sportspeople from West Bromwich